Tinea accusatrix is a species of moth in the family Tineidae. It was described by Edward Meyrick in 1916. However the placement of this species within the genus Tinea is in doubt. As a result, this species has been referred to as Tinea (s.l.) accusatrix. This species is endemic to New Zealand.

The wingspan is 8–10 mm. The forewings are dark fuscous with a short fine white median longitudinal line from the base and oblique white streaks from the costa at one-fourth and the middle reaching more than half across the wing, and shorter oblique marks from the dorsum opposite. There are seven white wedge-shaped marks from the costa on the posterior half, anteriorly somewhat oblique, posteriorly direct, one from the tornus and a dot on the termen beneath the apex, the space between these with violet and bronzy reflections. There is also a round deep black spot at the apex. The hindwings are light grey, with bronzy and purple reflections.

References

External links
Image of type specimen of Tinea s.l. accusatrix.

Moths described in 1916
Tineinae
Moths of New Zealand
Endemic fauna of New Zealand
Taxa named by Edward Meyrick
Endemic moths of New Zealand